Marasmiellus inoderma is a fungus in the family Marasmiaceae. It is a plant pathogen that causes root-rot of maize, Marasmiellus rot on banana and basal rot of golden shower orchid.

References

Banana diseases
Maize diseases
Fungi described in 1851
Orchid diseases
Marasmiaceae
Taxa named by Miles Joseph Berkeley